Oxievång is a neighbourhood of the Borough of Oxie, Malmö Municipality, Skåne County, Sweden.

References

Neighbourhoods of Malmö